Evita is a musical with music by Andrew Lloyd Webber and lyrics by Tim Rice. It concentrates on the life of Argentine political leader Eva Perón, the second wife of Argentine president Juan Perón. The story follows Evita's early life, rise to power, charity work, and death.

The musical began as a rock opera concept album released in 1976. Its success led to productions in London's West End in 1978, winning the Laurence Olivier Award for Best Musical, and on Broadway a year later, where it was the first British musical to receive the Tony Award for Best Musical.

This has been followed by a string of professional tours and worldwide productions and numerous cast albums, as well as a 1996 film adaptation. The musical was revived in London in 2006, and on Broadway in 2012, and toured the UK again in 2013–14 before running for 55 West End performances at the Dominion Theatre in September–October 2014.

Synopsis

Act I

On 26 July 1952, a crowd in a Buenos Aires, Argentina theatre is watching a movie ("A Cinema in Buenos Aires, 26 July 1952") that is interrupted when news breaks of the death of First Lady Eva Perón. Both the crowd and the nation go into a period of public mourning ("Requiem for Evita") as Che, a member of the public, marvels at the spectacle and promises to show how Eva did "nothing for years" ("Oh What a Circus").

In 1934, 15-year-old Eva Duarte lives in the city of Junín, and longs to seek a better life in Buenos Aires. Eva takes up with a tango singer-songwriter, Agustín Magaldi, after she meets him at one of his shows ("On This Night of a Thousand Stars"). Eva persuades Magaldi to take her with him to Buenos Aires, and though he is initially resistant, he eventually accepts ("Eva, Beware of the City"). Upon her arrival in the city, Eva sings about her hopes and ambitions of glory as an actress ("Buenos Aires").

After her arrival, Eva is quick to leave Magaldi, and Che relates how Eva sleeps her way up the social ladder, becoming a model, radio star, and actress ("Goodnight and Thank You"). He then tells of both a right-wing coup in 1943 and Eva's success, implying that Argentine politics and Eva's career may soon coincide. Che also makes a point to introduce the figure of Colonel Juan Domingo Perón, an ambitious military colonel who was making his way up the Argentine political ladder ("The Lady's Got Potential"). In a game of musical chairs that represents the rise of political figures, Perón and other military figures compete for power and exhibit their political strategy ("The Art of the Possible").

After a massive earthquake hits the town of San Juan, Perón organizes a charity concert at Luna Park to provide aid to the earthquake's victims. Eva attends and briefly reunites with Agustín Magaldi, who coldly shuns her for her past actions. Perón addresses the crowd with words of encouragement and leaps off the stage, meeting Eva as soon as he exits ("Charity Concert"). Eva and Perón share a secret rendezvous following the charity concert, where Eva hints that she could help Perón rise to power ("I'd Be Surprisingly Good For You"). Eva dismisses Perón's Mistress (the character is known only by that title), who ponders the rejection ("Another Suitcase in Another Hall").

Upon moving in with Perón, Eva is introduced to high society only to be met with disdain from the upper classes and the Argentine Army ("Perón's Latest Flame"). In 1946, after launching his presidential bid, Perón discusses his chances of winning the election with Eva. After reassuring him of their chances of winning, Eva organizes rallies for the descamisados and gives them hope for a better future while Perón and his allies plot to dispose of anyone who stands in their way ("A New Argentina").

During the period between Act I and Act II, Eva and Perón are married – a fact merely alluded to, in the "Casa Rosada balcony" scene, at the start of Act II.

Act II

Perón is elected President in a sweeping victory in 1946. He stands "On The Balcony of the Casa Rosada" addressing his descamisados (shirtless ones). Eva speaks from the balcony of the Presidential Palace to her adoring supporters, where she reveals that despite her initial goal of achieving fame and glory, she has found her true calling to be the people of her country ("Don't Cry for Me Argentina"). Che analyses the price of fame as Eva dances at the Inaugural Ball with Perón, now the president-elect ("High Flying, Adored").

Eva insists on a glamorous image to impress the people of Argentina and promote Peronism. She prepares to tour Europe as she is dressed for success by her fashion consultants ("Rainbow High"). Her famous 1946 tour meets with mixed results ("Rainbow Tour"); Spaniards adore her, but the Italians liken her husband to Benito Mussolini. France is impressed, and the English snub her by inviting her to a country estate, rather than Buckingham Palace. Eva affirms her disdain for the upper class, while Che asks her to start helping those in need as she made a promise ("The Actress Hasn't Learned the Lines (You'd Like to Hear)"). Eva begins the Eva Perón Foundation to direct her charity work. Che describes Eva's controvertible charitable work and possible money laundering ("And the Money Kept Rolling In (And Out)").

Eva appears at a church to take the sacrament in front of her adoring supporters ("Santa Evita"), but passes out suddenly, and while unconscious, appears to have a dream that reflects upon the conflicting views of her life. In her dream, she and Che heatedly debate her actions; Che accuses Eva of using the Argentine people for her own ends, while Eva cynically replies that there is no glory in trying to solve the world's problems from the sidelines ("A Waltz for Eva and Che"). At the end of the argument, Eva finally admits to herself and Che that she is dying and can't go on for much longer. Che points out the disastrous results of Perón's policies on Argentina: its treasury is bankrupt, its once-thriving beef industry is under rationing, and the press and other critics of the regime are muzzled.

Perón's generals finally get sick of Eva's meddling and demand that Perón force her to leave politics. However, Perón objects and claims that if it weren't for her, they would never have achieved as much as they have ("She Is a Diamond"). But he also concedes that she won't be able to keep working for long as she will soon succumb to her cancer. Even so, Eva is determined to run for Vice President, and Perón fears that the military will stage a coup if she runs and that Eva's health is too delicate for any stressful work, but Eva insists that she can continue, despite her failing health ("Dice Are Rolling/Eva's Sonnet").

Realizing she's about to die, Eva renounces her pursuit of the vice presidency and swears her eternal love to the people of Argentina ("Eva's Final Broadcast"). Eva's numerous achievements flash before her eyes before she dies ("Montage"), and she asks for forgiveness, contemplating her choice of fame instead of long reign ("Lament"). Evita dies, and embalmers preserve her body forever. Che notes a monument was set to be built for Evita but says "only the pedestal was completed, and Evita's body disappeared for 17 years."

Character roles
 Eva Perón (mezzo-soprano): Lead. Playing age 15–33
 Che (tenor): Lead. Playing age 21–35
 Juan Perón (baritone): Lead. Playing age 40–65
 Agustin Magaldi (tenor): Supporting. Playing age 23–35
 Perón's Mistress (mezzo-soprano): Supporting. Playing age 16
 Chorus (men, women and children of Argentina)

Notable casts

Notable replacements 
Broadway (1979–83)
Eva: Loni Ackerman, Nancy Opel
Che: Anthony Crivello
Broadway (2012–13)
Che: Max von Essen

Musical numbers

Act 1

 "A Cinema in Buenos Aires, 26 July 1952" – Crowd°
 "Requiem for Evita" – Chorus
 "Oh What a Circus" – Che and Crowd
 "On This Night of a Thousand Stars" – Magaldi
 "Eva and Magaldi" / "Eva, Beware of the City" – Eva, Magaldi, Che and Evita's Family
 "Buenos Aires" – Eva, Che and Crowd
 "Goodnight and Thank You" – Che, Eva, Magaldi and Lovers
 "The Lady's Got Potential" – Che*
 "The Art of the Possible" – Perón, Generals and Eva
 "Charity Concert" – Perón, Che, Magaldi and Eva
 "I'd Be Surprisingly Good for You" – Eva and Perón
 "Hello and Goodbye" – Eva
 "Another Suitcase in Another Hall" – Perón's Mistress and Men's Chorus
 "Peron's Latest Flame" – Che, Aristocrats, Soldiers and Eva
 "A New Argentina" – Eva, Che, Perón and Crowd

Act 2

 Entr'acte
 "On the Balcony of the Casa Rosada" – Perón, Che and Crowd
 "Don't Cry for Me Argentina" – Eva
 "High Flying, Adored" – Che and Eva
 "Rainbow High" – Eva and Dressers
 "Rainbow Tour" – Perón, Advisers and Che
 "The Actress Hasn't Learned the Lines (You'd Like to Hear)" – Eva, Aristocrats and Che
 "And the Money Kept Rolling In (And Out)" – Che and Crowd
 "Santa Evita" – Children and Chorus
 "A Waltz for Eva and Che" – Eva and Che
 "You Must Love Me" – Eva
 "Peron's Latest Flame Playoff" – Soldiers**
 "She Is a Diamond" – Perón**
 "Dice Are Rolling" / "Eva's Sonnet" – Perón and Eva
 "Eva's Final Broadcast" – Eva and Che
 "Montage" – Eva, Che, Perón, Magaldi and Chorus
 "Lament" – Eva, Embalmers and Che

Notes

 *This song is usually cut from most of the productions and replaced with "The Art of the Possible," but a modified version has appeared in a number of stagings.  It was revived by Alan Parker for the film, with modified lyrics by Tim Rice to remove the insecticide sub-plot.
 **These two songs are often credited as just "She is a Diamond".
°This was replaced by "Junin, 26 July 1952" for the Japanese productions, London and Broadway revivals.
"You Must Love Me", written for the 1996 film, was added to the 2006 London production and several other post-film productions; its placement varies from right after "Waltz for Eva and Che" to right before "Eva's Final Broadcast."
See Evita for the song list from the 1976 concept album.

History

In 1972, Robert Stigwood proposed that Andrew Lloyd Webber and Tim Rice develop a new musical version of Peter Pan, but abandoned the project.

Travelling late to a meal one night in 1973, though, Rice heard the end of a radio show about Eva Perón which intrigued him. As a child stamp collector, he had been fascinated by her image on the Argentine stamps, but was unaware of her significance in Argentina's history. He began research and was introduced by a Cinema International Corporation executive to the Argentine film director Carlos Pasini Hansen who had produced the TV film Queen of Hearts, which had aired in the UK on 24 October 1972. The executive also arranged for Rice to see the film at Thames Television which he did "at least twenty times" saying also that "by that time I had seen Pasini's superbly researched film, I was hooked." The more Rice investigated Eva Perón, going so far as to travel to Buenos Aires to research her life with many documents and contacts that Pasini had supplied, the more fascinated he became by the woman; he even named his first daughter after her.

Rice suggested the idea of a musical based on the subject to Lloyd Webber, but although the idea of writing a score including tangos, paso dobles, and similar Latin flavours intrigued him, Lloyd Webber ultimately rejected the idea. He decided instead to collaborate with Alan Ayckbourn on Jeeves, a traditional Rodgers and Hart-style musical based on the P. G. Wodehouse character, which proved to be a critical and commercial failure. After Jeeves, Lloyd Webber returned to Rice, and they began developing Rice's proposed musical.

The authors of the 1996 book Evita: The Real Life of Eva Perón claim the musical was based on Mary Main's biography The Woman with the Whip, which was extremely critical of Eva Perón. Rice created Che to serve as both narrator and represent the voice of the lower, working class, providing insight and criticism to Eva's character. When Harold Prince later became involved with the project, he insisted that the actors portraying Che should use Che Guevara as a role model. In the 1996 film adaptation, the character returned to his more anonymous roots. This was also the case for the 2006 London revival.

Lloyd Webber and the conductor Anthony Bowles presented the musical at the second Sydmonton Fest before making the recording with the London Philharmonic Orchestra.

Recording
As they had previously done with Jesus Christ Superstar, the songwriting team decided to record Evita as an album musical and selected actress and singer Julie Covington to sing the title role, after having caught an episode of Rock Follies and remembered her from the original London production of Godspell. The recording, which was released by MCA Records who had previously marketed Jesus Christ Superstar, commenced in April 1976 and was produced by Lloyd Webber and Rice. The recording was engineered by David Hamilton Smith, whose work Rice later acknowledged was effectively that of a third producer. He also delivered the line, "Statesmanship is more than entertaining peasants," a rebuttal to Eva's balcony speech on the album.

Released in 1976, the two-record set included Paul Jones as Juan Perón, Colm Wilkinson as Che, Barbara Dickson as Perón's mistress, and Tony Christie as Agustín Magaldi. The writers had originally considered Steve Marriott and John Fogerty but neither was interested. Murray Head, who had enormous success with the Superstar album, recorded some demos but Rice later admitted they "didn't really reproduce the magic that his portrayal of Judas had." Colm Wilkinson had recently played Judas in the London production of Superstar and agreed to audition: "It only took a couple of verses to know he was our man."

Mike d'Abo, who had succeeded Paul Jones as lead singer of Manfred Mann, had a minor role on the album which was notable as the first one which both had appeared. Mike Smith, former lead vocalist with the Dave Clark Five and d'Abo's then working partner, also appeared.

Pasini wrote the dialogue in Spanish of the first scene, "A Cinema in Buenos Aires, 26 July 1952". On this recording, he played the part of the actor in the soundtrack of a movie that grinds to a halt and also read the official communique of Eva's death. When the album was presented to the press at Lloyd Webber's country home Sydmonton, Pasini organised a photographic presentation with his colleague Anton Furst to accompany it. His contribution to the development of the project was recognised as Rice and Lloyd Webber acknowledged him first in a thank you speech afterwards.

In Britain, Australia, South Africa, South America, and various parts of Europe, sales of the concept album exceeded those of Jesus Christ Superstar; in the United States, however, it never achieved the same level of success. Covington's recording of "Don't Cry for Me Argentina" (originally titled "It's Only Your Lover Returning") was released in October 1976. It reached No. 1 on the UK Singles Chart and enjoyed similar success internationally. Dickson's "Another Suitcase in Another Hall" also became a hit. In the US and UK, respectively, Karen Carpenter, Olivia Newton-John, and Petula Clark released cover versions of "Don't Cry for Me, Argentina".

Musical analysis
The musical employs an eclectic range of styles. Classical music in Evita includes the opening choral piece ("Requiem for Evita") and a choral interlude in "Oh What a Circus", as well as instrumental passages throughout the musical such as the orchestral version of the "Lament" and the introduction to "Don't Cry for Me Argentina". Rhythmic Latinate styles are heard in pieces such as "Buenos Aires", "And the Money Kept Rolling in (And Out)" and "On This Night of a Thousand Stars", while ballads include "High Flying, Adored" and "Another Suitcase in Another Hall". Rock music includes "Oh What a Circus", "Perón's Latest Flame", and a song cut from the original production called "The Lady's Got Potential". The song was reinstated for the 1996 film with revised lyrics by Rice, and has also been used in Japanese, Czech, and Danish stage productions to expand on Argentine history for audiences less familiar with the subject.

Historical accuracy
Tomas Eloy Martinez noted:

The lyrics and storyline of the musical are based on Mary Main's biography, Evita: The Woman with the Whip, which drew heavily upon the accounts of anti-Perónist Argentines. Shortly after the musical appeared, Nicholas Fraser and Marysa Navarro published a more neutral account of Eva Perón's life, Evita: The Real Lives of Eva Perón, in which they claim that many of Main's assertions (which had influenced Rice's lyrics) were false, such as the suggestion that Eva had first gone to Buenos Aires as the mistress of a married musician, Agustín Magaldi. Instead, they wrote, Eva's mother Doña Juana had taken her there when she aspired to become a radio actress. Some critics also suggested that Rice's lyrics disparaged Evita's achievements unnecessarily, particularly her charity work. According to Navarro and Fraser,[Evita] was based for the most part on the earliest and seamiest versions of Evita's life, something happened to the tale in its retelling and the Evita who emerged each evening, dressed first as a teenager, then a hooker, and finally, in tulle and silver foil, as First Lady, was far from being unsympathetic.

Following the success of the film version of Evita, in 1996, an Argentinean film biography of Eva Perón was released, Eva Perón: The True Story, asserting that it corrected distortions in the musical's account.

Resident productions

Original West End production
When the recording was released, Lloyd Webber had sent a copy to the renowned American director Harold Prince and invited him to become involved with the eventual staging. Prince agreed, commenting, "Any opera that begins with a funeral can't be all bad", but he advised them that he could not take on any new commitments for the next two years. In the meantime, Lloyd Webber and Rice reworked several elements of the show. Some songs were dropped and some shortened, while others were introduced and some lyrics rewritten. Prince eventually confirmed that he would be ready to start rehearsals in early 1978. When he began working on the project in May, he suggested few changes, other than for deleting Che's rock number "The Lady's Got Potential". Prince requested a song he could stage to chart Perón's rise to power, and Rice and Lloyd Webber responded with the musical chairs number "The Art of the Possible", during which military officers are eliminated until only Perón remains.

Evita opened at the Prince Edward Theatre on 21 June 1978 and closed on 18 February 1986, after 3,176 performances. Elaine Paige played Eva with David Essex as Che, Joss Ackland as Perón, and Siobhán McCarthy as Mistress. Paige was selected from among many hopefuls, after Julie Covington declined the role. The production was directed by Harold Prince, choreographed by Larry Fuller, and produced by Robert Stigwood. Paige was succeeded by Marti Webb, Stephanie Lawrence, Siobhán McCarthy (who had played The Mistress when the show opened), Jacquey Chappell and ultimately, Kathryn Evans with Maria Morgan.

Webb originally played the role during Paige's holiday and was persuaded by Prince to remain in the cast as an alternate for two shows each week to aid the transition when she took over the role. This set the precedent until the show closed, with Lawrence becoming Webb's alternate. Michele Breeze, Paige's original understudy never inherited the role in London but later created it for the original New Zealand production. Susannah Fellows also understudied Eva.

Gary Bond replaced David Essex as Che, then Mark Ryan, who had first starred as Magaldi, later assumed the role, followed by Martin Smith and Jimmy Kean. Ackland's replacements included John Turner, Oz Clarke and Daniel Benzali.

In his review in The Sunday Times, Derek Jewell called the show "quite marvellous" and described Lloyd Webber's "ambitious" score "an unparallelled fusion of 20th century musical experience" and Rice's lyrics as "trenchant" and "witty". Bernard Levin of The Times disliked it, however, calling it as an "odious artefact ... that calls itself an opera ... merely because the clichés between the songs are sung rather than spoken" and "one of the most disagreeable evenings I have ever spent in my life".

This production won the Laurence Olivier Award for Best New Musical, and Elaine Paige won the Laurence Olivier Award for Best Performance in a Musical. Also receiving Olivier Award nominations were Harold Prince (Best Director) and David Essex (Best Performance in a Musical).

Timothy O'Brien and Tazeena Firth collaborated on the design of the show. The set was minimal, with a scaffolded balcony running along the back and sides of the stage and images projected onto a screen above. Madame Tussauds produced a wax figurine of Eva, based on Elaine Paige, for the coffin during the funeral scene at the beginning of the show. Inspired by the murals of Diego Rivera, Prince suggested the proscenium be flanked by artwork depicting the struggles of the Argentine peasants. He jettisoned the original monochromatic costumes designed for the chorus members and dancers; instead, he had them go to charity and secondhand clothing shops to purchase costumes. The now iconic balcony scene featured Eva in a broad, diamond encrusted white dress based on one actually owned by Eva Perón which had been designed by Christian Dior addressing a crowd from the rear balcony of the stage.

The Evita: Original London Cast Recording was recorded in 1978 and released by MCA Records. Some releases mistakenly refer to the concept album as the Original London Cast Recording.

The original London production transferred to the Opera House in Manchester for an extended run following its closure at the Prince Edward Theatre.  Kathryn Evans and Jimmy Kean played Eva and Che with Ria Jones and John Barr being their alternates.

Original Broadway production

After debuting at the Dorothy Chandler Pavilion in Los Angeles, with a subsequent engagement at the Orpheum Theatre in San Francisco, the Broadway production opened at the Broadway Theatre on 25 September 1979 and closed on 26 June 1983, after 1,567 performances and 17 previews. Patti LuPone starred as Eva, with Mandy Patinkin as Che, Bob Gunton as Perón, Mark Syers as Magaldi, and Jane Ohringer as Perón's mistress. Harold Prince directed with choreography by Larry Fuller. During the run, six actresses alternated playing the title role, in addition to LuPone: Terri Klausner (matinees), Nancy Opel (matinees), Pamela Blake (matinees), Derin Altay, Loni Ackerman and Florence Lacey. Patinkin was replaced by James Stein and later by Anthony Crivello. New York Times critic Frank Rich stated: "Loni Ackerman, the current Eva Perón, has no discernible Latin blood, but she sings the role better than any of the American Evitas, as well as acting and dancing it with nonstop energy. Anthony Crivello, a performer new to me, is easily the best Che I've seen in New York or London: not only does he have a supple voice, but he also moves with such grace that he lightens the heavy, moralizing tone his character must bear. He's so effective, in fact, that he almost convinces you that there's a sound reason for Che Guevara to be dragged into the Peron saga." Tom Carter understudied Patinkin and performed as Che.

LuPone has stated about her time in the show: "Evita was the worst experience of my life,' she said. 'I was screaming my way through a part that could only have been written by a man who hates women. And I had no support from the producers, who wanted a star performance onstage but treated me as an unknown backstage. It was like Beirut, and I fought like a banshee.'"

Elaine Paige was originally told she would re-create her role in the Broadway production, however the Actors' Equity Association refused permission for a non-American. Prince attempted to persuade the organisation for a second time when LuPone was suffering vocal problems before the production reached New York. LuPone stated in her memoir that this was nothing more than a rumour started by Prince himself to build publicity. She, however, had her own doubts about that being true.

Original Australian production 
The original Australian production opened at the Adelaide Festival Theatre on 30 April 1980. It featured Jennifer Murphy as Eva, John O'May as Che, Peter Carroll as Perón, Tony Alvarez as Magaldi, and Laura Mitchell as Perón's mistress. Patti LuPone took over the title role in mid-1981 during its Sydney run after Murphy left the production. LuPone's experience in the Sydney production was a much more positive one than her time on Broadway because by that time she felt comfortable singing the score and enjoyed playing the part.

Original Madrid production
The first Spanish language version premiered at the Teatro Monumental in Madrid on 23 December 1980, directed by Jaime Azpilicueta and with Paloma San Basilio as Eva, Patxi Andión as Che, Julio Catania as Perón, Tony Landa as Magaldi and Montserrat Vega as Perón's mistress. A double album recorded by the original cast was released and the song "No llores por mí Argentina" became a hit single. This production later played in Barcelona and in other cities in Latin America.

Original Mexican production
In Mexico City the show premiered at the Teatro Ferrocarrilero on 26 June 1981, with Valeria Lynch and Rocío Banquells alternating as Eva, Jaime Garza and Javier Díaz Dueñas alternating as Che, Jorge Pais as Perón, César Millán as Magaldi and Carmen Delgado as Perón's mistress.

Original Brazilian production
Directed by Maurício Shermann and starring Cláudia as Evita, Mauro Mendonça as Péron, Carlos Augusto Strazzer as Che, Sílvia Massari as Perón's mistress, and Hildon Prado as Magaldi, it premiered at Teatro João Caetano in Rio de Janeiro on 12 January 1983. It later moved to Teatro Palace in São Paulo in 1986. It opened to great success in Brazil, with the Brazilian singer Cláudia being considered by some critics as the best Evita of all the time. English producers Robert Stigwood and David Land, after watching the Brazilian production, said that Cláudia was the best Evita of all the singers who had played the role.

2006 London revival
On 2 June 2006, the first major London production of Evita since the original had closed 20 years earlier opened in the West End at the Adelphi Theatre. Directed by Michael Grandage, Argentine actress Elena Roger debuted as Eva, while Philip Quast appeared as Perón with Matt Rawle as Che. Its libretto included "You Must Love Me", written for the 1996 film, but which had not yet been included in an English-language stage production. The production opened to very positive reviews, but ticket sales were slow, which resulted in its closure on 26 May 2007 after a run of less than a year. Quast and Roger were nominated for Olivier Awards for their performances.

2010 Stratford Shakespeare Festival
The Stratford Shakespeare Festival produced Evita as its first rock musical from 28 to 6 May November 2010. The principal characters are played by Chilina Kennedy (Eva), Juan Chioran (Juan), and Josh Young (Che), with direction by Gary Griffin.

2011 Second Brazilian production
A second Brazilian production directed by Jorge Takla premiered at Teatro Alfa in March 2011, with Paula Capovilla as Evita, Daniel Boaventura as Perón and Fred Silveira as Che.

2012 Broadway revival
A Broadway revival of the show, based upon the 2006 West End production, ran at the Marquis Theatre, with Elena Roger in the title role, Ricky Martin as Che, Michael Cerveris as Perón, Max von Essen as Magaldi (he is also Ricky Martin's understudy) and Rachel Potter as Mistress. Christina DeCicco alternated with Roger as Eva. Michael Grandage again directed the production with choreography by Rob Ashford, set and costume design by Christopher Oram and lighting design by Neil Austin. ThItas produced by Hal Luftig and Scott Sanders. Previews began on 12 March 2012 with the official opening on 5 April 2012. The production was nominated for three Tony Awards, including Best Musical Revival. It closed on 26 January 2013 after 337 performances and 26 previews.

2013/2014 Italian production
The first Italian production premiered in Sanremo (IM) 5 December 2013, directed by Susanna Tagliapietra, with Italian lyrics by Marco Savatteri. The original cast included Simona Angioloni as Eva Duarte, Edoardo Pallanca as Che, Agostino Marafioti as Juan Perón, Matteo Merli as Magaldi, Diletta Mangolini as Mistress, replaced by Simona Marrocco in the touring production.

2019 productions
Regent's Park Open Air Theatre presented the musical (directed by Jamie Lloyd) from 2 August – 21 September 2019.

New York City Center also presented the musical in 2019, directed by Sammi Cannold) from 13 – 24 November 2019. The musical opened to mixed reviews, and featured two actresses in the role of Eva. Maia Reficco as young Eva from 15–20, and Solea Pfeiffer from 20–33.

Touring productions
There have been numerous US and international touring productions of the show:

Early 1980s US national tours

The 1980–1983 1st US national tour opened at the Shubert Theatre in Los Angeles and starred Loni Ackerman as Eva, Scott Holmes as Che, Jon Cypher as Juan Perón, Sal Mistretta as Magaldi and Cynthia Hunt as Perón's Mistress. The 1979-1983 2nd US national tour opened at the Shubert Theatre in Chicago and subsequently toured to major U.S. cities starring Valerie Perri as Eva, John Herrera as Che, Robb Alton as Juan Perón, Peter Marinos as Magaldi and Cynthia Simpson as Perón's Mistress. The 2nd National went on to finish touring Scandinavia. The 1984 3rd US National Tour opened at the Masonic Temple Theatre in Detroit and starred Florence Lacey as Eva, Tim Bowman as Che, John Leslie Wolfe as Juan Perón, Vincent Pirillo as Magaldi and Patricia Ludd as Perón's Mistress. In the 1983 and 1986 US tours, Florence Lacey played Eva.

1987 UK and Irish Tour

Rebecca Storm played Eva with Chris Corcoran as Che.

1988 European Tour
Rebecca (Becky) Norman played Eva with James Sbano as Che and David Wasson as Perón with performances in Italy, Holland and Germany.

1989 World Tour

Florence Lacey starred once more with James Sbano as Che and Robert Alton as Perón.

1994 US Tour

A touring production was mounted in anticipation of the film version which lasted over a year and featured several actresses in the title role, including future Tony nominee Marla Schaffel. It was directed and choreographed by Larry Fuller and featured Daniel C. Cooney as Che.

1995–1996 UK Tour

Paul Nicholas and David Ian, with the original producers Robert Stigwood and David Land, mounted a version closely based on the original London production starring Marti Webb, one of the first performers to play Eva, with Chris Corcoran as Che, Duncan Smith as Perón, Leo Andrew as Magaldi and Poppy Tierney as the mistress. Despite some criticism over the casting of Webb at the age of 50, the success of the tour led to extensions throughout 1996.

1998 US 20th Anniversary Tour

A tour, based on the original Broadway production, which was originally scheduled to play on Broadway in the 1999–2000 season started in Detroit on 3 November 1998 and closed in Boston, Massachusetts, in the summer of 1999. It starred Natalie Toro as Eva, with Raul Esparza as Che and Raymond Jaramillo McLeod as Juan Perón. This production focused more on Latin themes. According to Playbill, "The Latin casting is part of an effort to instill this production with a more culturally authentic feel." Toro received excellent reviews, along with her leading men.

2004 US Tour

A production opened in November 2004 with Kathy Voytko and Bradley Dean, directed by Harold Prince and Larry Fuller. This production closed in May 2007 but reopened later that year. It closed finally in June 2008.

2008 UK Tour

A tour, following the then recent London production, began in 2008 starring Louise Dearman and later Rachael Wooding as Eva, Seamus Cullen (a finalist in the BBC show Any Dream Will Do) as Che, Mark Heenehan as Perón with James Waud as Magaldi who won the role in a competition, and Nikki Mae as Perón's Mistress, later Carly Bowmen. The UK tour ended in late 2009 but was remounted in March 2010, touring throughout Europe until April 2011. It continued in the UK and Germany from May to September 2011 featuring Abigail Jaye as Eva, Mark Powell as Che, Mark Heenehan as Perón and Reuben Kaye as Magaldi.

2013 US Tour

A US national tour of the musical, based on the 2012 Broadway revival, began in September 2013. The cast for the tour included Caroline Bowman as Eva, Josh Young as Che, Sean McLaughlin as Perón, Christopher Johnstone as Magaldi, Krystina Alabado as Mistress and Desi Oakley as the alternate for Eva Perón.

2013–2014 UK Tour

A tour, announced after the success of the Broadway production of the show, which was produced by Bill Kenwright. It opened on 15 May 2013 at the New Wimbledon Theatre, before dates at the Glasgow Kings Theatre, Theatre Royal Norwich, and the Wolverhampton Grand. The production starred Marti Pellow, the lead singer of the band Wet Wet Wet, as Che, Andrew C Wadsworth as Juan Perón, and Madalena Alberto as Eva Perón. The tour concluded with 55 performances at the Dominion Theatre in the West End in September and October 2014. This production was directed by Bob Thompson, with choreography by Bill Deamer, and musical direction by David Steadman.

2017 UK Tour

A replica of the 2013–2014 UK Tour began touring early 2017, once again in the UK. Led by Emma Hatton, with Gian Marco Schiaretti as Che; Jeremy Secomb as Juan Perón; Oscar Balmaseda as Magaldi and Sarah O’Connor as the Mistress; this production ran through to July. In the same way the previous tour had a limited London run, this production performed a limited 91 performance run (due to the failure of The Girls) at the Phoenix Theatre from July to October 2017. Hatton reprised her role along with all her previous cast members. The tour then continued into 2018.

2017/2018 International Tour

A revival of the original production (as directed by Hal Prince and choreographed by Larry Fuller) toured South Africa, Japan, Singapore, Taiwan, and Hong Kong, featuring a cast from South Africa and led by Emma Kingston from the UK in the title role.

The Singapore season ran from 23 February 2018 to 18 March 2018 in the Marina Bay Sands Theatre. 18 young talents were selected to be cast in this Evita production. Three sets of six children alternate in ensemble roles. The young actors are: Federica Aramburu, Lilo Baier, Mika Barel, Charmaine Chan, Hindya Dickinson, Jasmine Huilian Ellis, Gabriel Frade, Sam Howie, Annabelle Jarvis, Jayden Alim Lai, Lia Marie Elaine Macdonell, Max Makatsaria, Nanako Masui, Faith Ong, Sofia Ella Poston, Sebastian Street, Damien Rocco Weber, Charisse Low Yu Xin.

2018 Australian Tour

A 2018 Australian revival of the stage musical, directed by Harold Prince, was announced on 21 August 2017, by Opera Australia, with Australian singer-songwriter, musician, musical theatre actress Tina Arena being confirmed as the lead actress. The stage tour production will begin at the Sydney Opera House, in the Joan Sutherland Theatre, with opening night on 13 September, running to 3 November 2018. The next venue on the national tour leg will be at the Arts Centre Melbourne, from 5–30 December 2018. Arena says she felt the time was right to tackle the role. "I have been approached to do this role on a couple of occasions," Arena stated. "I never felt emotionally ready for it. I felt I had a lot of living and learning before I could get up and take on the enormity of the story and the human spirit she possessed".

On 7 May 2018, Opera Australia Artistic Director Lyndon Terracini, along with producers John Frost and David Ian, announced the full cast for the upcoming Australian production of Evita. With Arena announced in the lead role as Eva Perón, the remainder of the cast was announced as: Paulo Szot, Brazilian operatic baritone in the role of Juan Perón; Kurt Kansley will take on the role of the revolutionary Che Guevara. Michael Falzon will portray tango singer Agustín Magaldi, while the role of Perón's Mistress will be played by Alexis van Maanen. Jemma Rix has been cast as the alternate Eva Perón and is currently scheduled to be appearing in the role at least once a week (the Wednesday 7:30 pm show) throughout the Sydney season, according to the Evita-Australia website.

On 21 July 2018, Opera Australia Artistic Director Lyndon Terracini, along with producers John Frost and David Ian, announced the 18 young performers who have been cast in the upcoming production of Evita, in season at the Sydney Opera House from September 2018. Three sets of six children will alternate in ensemble roles. The young actors are: Jack Barton, Alysiah Carlino, Julien Daher, Jacob Drew, Paige Hewlett, BeBe Liu-Brennan, Robbi Morgan, Allerah Murdock, William Oakley, Pamelia Papacosta, Benjamin Park, Sara Petrovski, Raffaella Reid, Avaleigh Rock, Amelie Rose, Austin Taylor, Oliver Trus, and Zoe Zantey.

Film adaptation

Plans for a film directed by Ken Russell developed soon after the West End and Broadway openings. Much speculation of potential leads included Barbra Streisand or Liza Minnelli as Eva, and Barry Gibb or Elton John as Che. These plans never came to fruition.

Russell has said that his own first choice for the film lead was Karla DeVito, who had come to fame in rock tours and on Broadway, where she had impressed the wife of Andrew Lloyd Webber.  DeVito was screen tested for the role while in England shooting music videos for her solo album "Is This A Cool World or What?"  DeVito's performance of "Don't Cry For Me, Argentina" in the screen test caused much positive buzz.  Russell wrote that she brought viewers to tears (except Tim Rice – who wanted Elaine Paige, with whom he was romantically involved).  Although Russell rejected the idea, Paige was screen tested twice.

Russell's biography indicates that he met with Barbra Streisand, who dismissed the role immediately.  He wrote that he then suggested Liza Minnelli.  A year had passed between the first screen tests and Minnelli's, which Russell reports was amazing.  Russell approached Stigwood with Minnelli's test, convinced she had the necessary talent and star quality, but he was soon told it was going to be Elaine Paige.  Having already protested that idea, Russell quit the film.  Years later when he saw Karla DeVito again, Russell addressed her as "My Evita."

It was not until 1996 that Evita came to the big screen. Alan Parker directed the film, with Madonna in the title role, Antonio Banderas as Che and Jonathan Pryce as Perón. The film was nominated for five Academy Awards, winning one for Best Original Song ("You Must Love Me," composed especially for the film). Madonna received mixed reviews but received a Golden Globe Award for Best Actress – Motion Picture Musical or Comedy for her performance. The film was choreographed by Vincent Paterson.

Awards and nominations

Original West End production

Original Broadway production

2006 West End revival

2012 Broadway revival

2019 London revival

Cultural impact
Evita came in sixth in a BBC Radio 2 listener poll of the UK's "Number One Essential Musicals".

One episode of The Simpsons, "The President Wore Pearls", has a plot loosely based on the musical, with Lisa Simpson in Eva's role. The episode includes parodies of songs such as "A Vote For A Winner" which includes the lyrics, "don't cry for me, kids of Springfield".  At the end of the episode, a comical disclaimer is displayed stating, "On the advice of our lawyers, we swear we have never heard of a musical based on the life of Eva Perón".

During Glee, "Special Education", the characters Kurt Hummel and Rachel Berry sing "Don't Cry for Me, Argentina" when Kurt is auditioning for a solo in the Warblers for Sectionals. In the season three episode "Hold On to Sixteen", a rival showchoir sings "Buenos Aires" as their competition piece.

In the short "The Ballad of Magellan" in the cartoon series Animaniacs, the country of Argentina is depicted with a sign reading, "EVITA Coming Soon!".

Recordings

First recorded by a cast assembled specifically for the recording in 1976, the first stage cast recording of Evita was of the original London production in 1978. The original Broadway cast was recorded for an album released in 1979. Lloyd Webber and Rice produced these first three recordings.

At least 25 English language cast albums have been released, along with many foreign language recordings. There are currently four in Spanish, five German, three in Japanese, and two in Hebrew, with additional recordings in Czech, Danish, Dutch, French, Hungarian, Icelandic, Korean, Portuguese, and Swedish.

Soprano Kiri Te Kanawa recorded a complete operatic version of the score with Christopher Lee as Perón. This recording, however, has never been released. Marti Webb also recorded a highlights album of sorts for the Pickwick Records label that featured Dave Willetts and Carl Wayne. It was released to coincide with the 1995 UK Tour of the show in which Webb starred.

English cast albums

Notes

References
Citron, Stephen, Sondheim & Lloyd-Webber: The New Musical (2001). New York: Oxford University Press. 
Fraser, Nicholas, and Navarro, Marysa. Evita: The Real Life of Eva Perón (1996). New York: W. W. Norton & Company.

External links

Evita at Andrew Lloyd Webber's Really Useful Group
'Powerful' Production of Evita Plymouth Herald, 27 May 2009
Evita musical 
 (archive)
 (archive)
Official Broadway Site
Don't Cry for Hartlepool Marina

1976 soundtrack albums
1978 musicals
Biographical musicals
British musicals
Broadway musicals
Cultural depictions of Eva Perón
Drama Desk Award-winning musicals
Laurence Olivier Award-winning musicals
Musicals by Andrew Lloyd Webber and Tim Rice
Plays set in the 1930s
Plays set in the 1940s
Plays set in the 1950s
Plays set in South America
Rock operas
Sung-through musicals
Theatre soundtracks
Tony Award for Best Musical
Tony Award-winning musicals
West End musicals